Bright Road is a 1953 low-budget film adapted from the Christopher Award-winning short story "See How They Run" by Mary Elizabeth Vroman.  Directed by Gerald Mayer and featuring a nearly all-black cast, the film stars Dorothy Dandridge as an idealistic first-year elementary school teacher trying to reach out to a problem student.  The movie is also notable as the first feature film appearance by Harry Belafonte, who co-stars as the principal of the school.

Plot
Jane Richards (Dandridge) is a new teacher, beginning her career at a rural black elementary school in Alabama. One of the students in her fourth-grade class is C.T. Young (Philip Hepburn), who although bright and generally not a troublemaker, is nonetheless markedly uninterested in school and has become accustomed to taking two years to advance through each grade level.  He is one of nine children of a semi-employed laborer.  Miss Richards becomes determined to get through to C.T. and have her class be the first that does not take him two years to complete, though the school's other teachers have given up on him as "a backward child". The school's principal Mr. Williams (Belafonte) also harbors his doubts about C.T., but he admires Miss Richards' enthusiasm and endorses her efforts, including putting the boy on their free lunch list.  She is also shown teaching children's Sunday School.

Miss Richards' efforts with C.T. begin to pay dividends and his grades improve somewhat, but all of her progress with him seems to be undone when C.T.'s classmate and closest friend Tanya (Barbara Ann Sanders) dies after being stricken with viral pneumonia.  Devastated at the loss, C.T. runs away from school for a time, and upon his return, he immediately starts a schoolyard fight.  Insistence that he apologize for his actions causes him only to completely withdraw and isolate himself from his teacher and classmates.  Frustrated and saddened, Miss Richards must return to giving C.T. the failing marks that had been his previous pattern.

One day, however, she overhears C.T. helping another student with arithmetic. This proves that despite his stubborn refusal to participate in class since returning to school, he has actually continued to learn.  Seeing this demonstration of knowledge, she is heartened and quietly changes his most recent failing grade to an 'A'.  C.T.'s reintegration into the class is completed when he calmly handles a situation in which a swarm of bees invades the classroom, following the queen bee that had flown in.  As the other students and even Miss Richards panic and swat at the bees, C.T. calmly collects the queen and carries it outside with the swarm following him.

The school year ends with Miss Richards' class observing a caterpillar emerge from its cocoon transformed into a butterfly.  Miss Richards notes that it is reborn, "just as you and I will be born again someday, and everyone we've ever known or loved", and that witnessing the butterfly's first flight represents "a wonderful promise of things to come."  As he leaves to begin his summer vacation, C.T. offers Miss Richards a final validation of the time she had invested in him by stopping to tell her that he loves her.

Cast

 Dorothy Dandridge - Jane Richards
 Robert Horton - Dr. Mitchell
 Philip Hepburn - C.T. Young
 Harry Belafonte - Mr. Williams, School Principal
 Barbara Ann Sanders - Tanya
 Maidie Norman - Tanya's Mother
 Rene Beard - Booker T. Jones
 Howard McNeeley - Boyd
 Robert McNeeley - Lloyd
 Patti Marie Ellis - Rachel Smith
 Joy Jackson - Sarahlene Babcock
 Fred Moultrie - Roger
 James Moultrie - George
 Carolyn Ann Jackson - Mary Louise
 Clarence Nash - Bird Whistling Solo (voice, Uncredited)
 Vivian Dandridge - Miss Nelson

Production
Bright Road was produced at MGM by Sol Baer Fielding.

"See How They Run" was Mary Elizabeth Vroman's first published short story, written while she was a schoolteacher in rural Alabama. First published in Ladies' Home Journal in 1951, it also appeared in Ebony magazine in 1952. When Metro-Goldwyn-Mayer purchased the rights to adapt the story to film, Vroman helped write the screenplay, and as a result, became the first black member of the Screen Writers Guild.

Belafonte and Dandridge were known to audiences for their singing talents and Bright Road showcases each of these talents. Early in the film, Belafonte gives the debut performance of his song "Suzanne (Every Night When the Sun Goes Down)". Later, Dandridge briefly sings words from the Alfred Tennyson poem "The Princess: Sweet and Low" to the tune of a lullaby.  Belafonte and Dandridge co-starred again the following year in the musical film Carmen Jones (1954).

Reception
Bright Road was not commercially successful and was criticized for having "dealt too timidly with racial and economic questions." Dandridge, however, had been specifically attracted to the lack of racial conflict in Bright Road's story.  She wrote that she was "profoundly fond of ... a theme which showed that beneath any color skin, people were simply people. I had a feeling that themes like this might do more real good than the more hard-hitting protest pictures. I wanted any black girl in the audience to look at me performing in this film and be able to say to herself, 'Why, this schoolteacher could be me.'"

Box office
According to MGM records, the film only earned $179,000 in the US and Canada and $73,000 elsewhere, resulting in a loss of $263,000.

References

External links 
 
 
 
 

1953 films
1953 drama films
African-American drama films
American black-and-white films
American coming-of-age drama films
1950s English-language films
Films about educators
Films based on short fiction
Films scored by David Rose
Films set in Alabama
Metro-Goldwyn-Mayer films
1950s coming-of-age drama films
1950s American films